 

The Northern Ireland Act 1998 is an Act of the Parliament of the United Kingdom which allowed Westminster to devolve power to Northern Ireland, after decades of direct rule.

It renamed the New Northern Ireland Assembly, established by the Northern Ireland (Elections) Act 1998, to the Northern Ireland Assembly.

It repealed parts of the Government of Ireland Act 1920 and Northern Ireland Constitution Act 1973, and established new rules in line with the European Union and the Northern Ireland peace process, subsequent to the Belfast Agreement of 1998.

The Act allows for a devolved Northern Ireland Assembly of 108 members. Membership of the assembly is subject to a pledge of office, which subjects the member to certain requirements with regard to standards and responsibilities. Northern Ireland remains a part of the United Kingdom until or unless a majority vote in a referendum determines otherwise. The Secretary of State for Northern Ireland holds the power to call for the referendum if it appears likely to him that a majority of the voters would express their desire to become part of a United Ireland. The Assembly has the power of modifying any Act of the British Parliament as far as it "is part of the law of Northern Ireland". They cannot deal, however, with reserved or excepted matters, which are of exclusive competence of the government of the United Kingdom, in consultation with the Republic of Ireland through the British-Irish Intergovernmental Conference. The Assembly has been suspended a number of times since 1998, and was re-established on Tuesday 8 May 2007, subsequent to the St Andrews Agreement of 2006.

Election to the Assembly is by single transferable vote (STV), a form of proportional representation.

See also
Belfast Agreement
Cross-community vote
Ireland Act 1949

Notes

Further reading
  Walker,  Graham. "Scotland, Northern Ireland, and Devolution, 1945–1979," Journal of British Studies Jan. 2010, Vol. 49, No. 1: 117-142.

External links
Website of the Northern Ireland Assembly

Government of Northern Ireland
United Kingdom Acts of Parliament 1998
Constitutional laws of Northern Ireland
Northern Ireland peace process
1998 in Northern Ireland
Acts of the Parliament of the United Kingdom concerning Northern Ireland
Northern Ireland devolution
November 1998 events in the United Kingdom